The molecular formula C15H22N2O2 may refer to:

 Alprenoxime, a beta blocker and prodrug to alprenolol
 Mepindolol, a non-selective beta blocker used to treat glaucoma

Molecular formulas